Shantou Railway Station is a railway station located in Longhu District, Shantou. It opened on 28 December 1995, situating on the eastern end of Guangzhou–Meizhou–Shantou railway, and later also branching off from Xiamen–Shenzhen railway (currently to Shenzhen North or beyond only).

Basic Information 
Shantou Railway Station locates in Longhu District, which serves citizens in the urban area of Shantou.

It currently manages 36 trains, in which 17 are departure there.

It was originally a station of Guangzhou–Meizhou–Shantou railway, and later connected to Xiamen–Shenzhen railway by a connecting railway line. This line was connected to Meizhou West via the Meizhou-Chaoshan railway in October 2019 providing additional journey options.

Departure Trains 

Please note the above only presents initial train numbers. Train numbers are subject to changes at some intermediate stations.

Connected Lines 
 Guangzhou–Meizhou–Shantou railway
 Xiamen–Shenzhen railway

The station is currently a terminus. However, it will become a through-station with the opening of the Shantou–Shanwei high-speed railway.

The Shantou Connecting Line to Xiamen–Shenzhen Railway 
The Shantou connecting line to Xiamen–Shenzhen railway, is a railway constructed to solve the inconvenience of reaching Chaoshan railway station or Chaoyang railway station, for citizens living in the main city.

This line was planned in August 2007, approved in December 2013, construction commenced on 10 May 2015, completed and tested on 8 December 2018 and  opened on 5 January 2019.

History 
 28 December 1995 - Established
 1 July 2014 - Added a new line towards Chongqing North railway station
 5 January 2019 - Added a new line connecting to the existing Xiamen–Shenzhen railway

See also 

 Shantou South railway station

References 

Railway stations opened in 1995